Miguel Ángel Cuéllar (born 25 September 1982) is a retired Paraguayan footballer who played as a striker.

External links

Miguel Ángel Cuéllar at Football-Lineups

1982 births
Living people
Paraguayan footballers
Paraguayan expatriate footballers
Sportivo Luqueño players
12 de Octubre Football Club players
Club Sol de América footballers
CFR Cluj players
Club Bolívar players
Deportivo Pereira footballers
Club Atlético Tigre footballers
Cobresal footballers
Cobreloa footballers
Deportes La Serena footballers
Club Rubio Ñu footballers
Club San José players
Paraguayan Primera División players
Chilean Primera División players
Categoría Primera A players
Bolivian Primera División players
Liga I players
Expatriate footballers in Chile
Expatriate footballers in Argentina
Expatriate footballers in Colombia
Expatriate footballers in Bolivia
Expatriate footballers in Romania
Paraguayan expatriate sportspeople in Argentina
Paraguayan expatriate sportspeople in Chile
Paraguayan expatriate sportspeople in Colombia
Paraguayan expatriate sportspeople in Bolivia
Paraguayan expatriate sportspeople in Romania
Association football forwards